VetUK Ltd. is an online retailer supplying pet care products including toys, accessories, pet food, over-the-counter pet treatments, and veterinary prescription medicines.  The company was founded in 2005, reached their millionth order in 2012, and their two millionth order in 2014.

Overview
The VetUK headquarters are located in Thirsk, North Yorkshire, with an IT office based at York Science Park, University of York. The company had a £10M turnover in 2010. 

As of 2012, VetUK employed 32 people and sold about 10,000 different products. It was averaging 30% growth year-over-year.

VetUK sells products under the Max and Molly, Nutrecare, and PetUK brand names in the UK and continental Europe. It is headed by Iain Booth. It markets itself primarily through word of mouth. The company is partnered with the Yorkshire Air Ambulance and Yorkshire Wildlife Trust charities.

History
VetUK was established in 2005 by veterinary surgeon Iain Booth and scientist Lyane Haywood to sell over-the-counter veterinary medicines. According to Booth "I had clients telling me there wasn't enough choice and products were too expensive, so I had thought about selling pet medicines over the internet. I tested my idea first selling via eBay, and when I realised people liked it, I launched the site." The company was entirely self-funded, and initially it operated out of Booth's living room.

In 2010, VetUK launched an app called "V-E-T" to locate the nearest emergency vet.  

By 2011, when VetUK was nominated for "Large Business and Retailer of the Year" at The Press Business Awards, the company employed 22 people and had annual sales of £10 million. In August 2011, it launched PetUK, its own brand of pet food and accessories. 

In August 2012, VetUK bought Nutrecare, retaining the brand name of its products.  None of Nutrecare's five employees chose to make the move as operations were transferred from Kidderminster to Thirsk. About a month later, VetUK processed its millionth order.

References

External links

Pet stores
Online retailers of the United Kingdom
Pets in the United Kingdom
Companies based in Hambleton District
British companies established in 2005
Retail companies established in 2005